The year 1950 in television involved some significant events.
Below is a list of television-related events during 1950.



Events 
 February – European Broadcasting Union (EBU) inaugurated.
 February 15 
 KENS began transmissions as KEYL. It was the second television station to sign on in the San Antonio market.
 WSTM-TV began transmissions as WSYR-TV. It was Syracuse's second television station, signing on a year and three months after WHEN-TV (now WTVH).
 February 21 – WOI-TV signs on the air as Iowa's second television station (following WOC-TV, now KQWC-TV), and the first in the Des Moines area.
 February 23 – First televised report of general election results in the United Kingdom.
 March 27 – WHAS-TV signs on the air. It was the second television station to sign on in the Louisville market and the Commonwealth of Kentucky.
 April 2 – WTKR began operations on channel 4 as WTAR-TV. It was Hampton Roads' first television station and the second television station in Virginia, after WTVR (channel 6) in Richmond.
 April 4 – The BBC Television (UK) aspect ratio changes from 5:4 to 4:3.
 May 1 – WLNS-TV began transmissions as WJIM-TV. It is Michigan's second-oldest television station outside Detroit.
 May – Desilu Productions formed by Desi Arnaz and Lucille Ball in the United States.
 June 1 – WWMT signs on the air as WKZO-TV. It was West Michigan's second television station to debut after WLAV-TV (channel 7, now WOOD-TV channel 8 in Grand Rapids).
 June 17 – WAND (at this time called WTVP) goes on the air in Decatur, Illinois.
 July 1 – WHBF-TV signs on the air. It is the fifth-oldest surviving station in Illinois, and the oldest outside Chicago.
 July 26 – First television broadcast station in Mexico, XHTV, Mexico City on channel 4; Gonzalo Castellot Madrazo is the first announcer to appear.
 September 18 – First television network in South America launches, PRF-TV on channel 3 in São Paulo, Brazil.
 September 30 
 First BBC television broadcast from an aircraft.
 WSMV-TV began transmissions as WSM-TV at 1:10 pm CT. It was Nashville's first television station and the second in Tennessee.
 October 10 – The U.S. Federal Communications Commission approves CBS's color television system, effective November 20.
 October 25 - Cuba signs on to television as Havana's Union Radio TV signs on for the first time, the first television station in the Caribbean.

New shows 
 January 4 – Abe Burrows' Almanac debuts on CBS (1950).
 February 2 – What's My Line (1950) debuts on CBS (1950–1967).
 February 25 – Your Show of Shows premieres on NBC (1950–1954).
 March 23 – Beat the Clock premieres on CBS (1950–1961).
 June 17–October 12 – Hawkins Falls premieres on NBC (1951–1955).
 July 3 – The Hazel Scott Show on the DuMont Television Network (1950).
 July 10 – Your Hit Parade premieres on NBC.
 July 11 – Andy Pandy premieres on the BBC (1950, 1970, 2002).
 September 5 – The Cisco Kid, starring Duncan Renaldo and Leo Carillo, premieres (1950-1956).
 September 6 – Stars Over Hollywood premieres on NBC (1950-1951).
 September 7 – The game show Truth or Consequences debuts (1950–1988).
 September 10 – The Colgate Comedy Hour series debuts on NBC (1950-1955).
 September 18 – The Paul Winchell Show debuts on NBC with the title The Speidel Show.
 October 4 – Four Star Revue debuts on NBC (1950–1953).
 October 5 – The comedy quiz show You Bet Your Life, featuring Groucho Marx, premieres (1950–1961).
 October 12 – The George Burns and Gracie Allen Show debuts (1950–1958).
 October 28 – The Jack Benny Program, starring Jack Benny, premieres (1950–1965).

Television series

Programs ending during 1950

Births

References